The 7s Premier League (known as the NBM 7s Premier League for sponsorship reasons) is an annual rugby union sevens competition in South Africa.

Teams
The following teams took part in the 7s Premier League competitions to date:

References

External links
 Official 7s Premier League website
 SWD Eagles 7s Premier League page

 
Rugby sevens competitions in South Africa
2012 establishments in South Africa
Sports leagues established in 2012